Auguste Berthault (27 July 1878 – 30 May 1958) was a French racing cyclist. He rode in the 1922 Tour de France.

References

1878 births
1958 deaths
French male cyclists
Place of birth missing